"Higher State of Consciousness" is a song by American DJ Josh Wink. It was first released in March 1995. In 2022, Rolling Stone ranked it number 128 in their list of 200 Greatest Dance Songs of All Time.

Background
The song was initially a hit in the United Kingdom in 1995, where it reached number eight on the UK Singles Chart. The official 'Original Tweekin' Acid Funk Mix' was remixed by several artists the following year. The radio edit was remixed by Dex and Jonesey and the single peaked at number seven on the UK Singles Chart. The track was remixed for a third time in 2007 by Serbian-Australian DJ Dirty South and Australian dance act TV Rock. This remix reached number five in Finland and allowed the original version to climb to number three on the UK Dance Chart. A key sample from the track was used by The Porn Kings for their 1996 track "Up to No Good". Josh Wink had no control over the artists/remixers selection nor over the final decision to release those remixes.

Critical reception
British magazine Music Week rated the song four out of five upon the release of the 1996 remixes.

Track listings
 1995 UK CD single
"Higher State of Consciousness" (radio edit) (2:55)
"Higher State of Consciousness" (original Tweekin' Acid Funk edit) (3:00)
"Higher State of Consciousness" (DJ Wink's Hardhouse mix) (7:56)
"Higher State of Consciousness" (Jules & Skins Short Vox mix) (4:46)
"Higher State of Consciousness" (Jules & Skins Long & Epic mix) (6:33)

 1996 UK CD single
"Higher State of Consciousness" (radio edit (Dex And Jonesey)) (3:39)
"Higher State of Consciousness" (original Tweekin' Acid Funk mix) (6:16)
"Higher State of Consciousness" (Dex & Jonesey's Higher Stated mix) (6:44)
"Higher State of Consciousness" (Mr Spring's Maggott mix) (7:13)
"Higher State of Consciousness" (Itty Bitty Boozy Woozy mix) (6:06)
"Higher State of Consciousness" (Jules and Skins long epic mix) (6:37)

 2007 UK CD single
"Higher State of Consciousness" (Dirty South & TV rock radio edit)
"Higher State of Consciousness" (Dirty South & TV rock club mix)
"Higher State of Consciousness" (Marco V remix)
"Higher State of Consciousness" (Barratt & Falconi remix)
"Higher State of Consciousness" (Original Tweekin Acid Funk mix)

Charts

Original release

1996 remixes

2007 remix

Year-end charts

Certifications

References

1995 singles
Techno songs
Big beat songs
Strictly Rhythm singles